Predsednici Predsedništva Predsednika is the best of compilation by the Serbian punk rock band Atheist Rap, released by Hi-Fi Centar in 2001.

Track listing

External links 
 EX YU ROCK enciklopedija 1960-2006, Janjatović Petar; 
 Predsednici Predsedništva Predsednika at Discogs
 Official site discography page

Atheist Rap albums
2001 compilation albums
Hi-Fi Centar compilation albums